The 1973 All-Ireland Senior Camogie Championship Final was the 42nd All-Ireland Final and the deciding match of the 1973 All-Ireland Senior Camogie Championship, an inter-county camogie tournament for the top teams in Ireland.

Cork won by the narrowest of margins, with Ann Phelan scoring 2-1.

References

All-Ireland Senior Camogie Championship Finals
All-Ireland Senior Camogie Championship Final
All-Ireland Senior Camogie Championship Final
All-Ireland Senior Camogie Championship Final
All-Ireland Senior Camogie Championship Final, 1973
Cork county camogie team matches